This bibliography of James Madison is a list of published works about James Madison, the 4th president of the United States.

Biographies
 
 
 , the standard scholarly biography 
  single volume condensation of 6-vol biography 
 
 
 
  detailed popular history
  
  Ebook
 
 
 , scholarly biography; paperback ed.
 
 
 
 
 
  scholarly overview of his two terms.

Analytic studies
 
 
  short survey with primary sources

Historiography

Primary sources
 ; The main scholarly edition
 "Founders Online," searchable edition
 
 
 
 
 
 
 
  reprints his major messages and reports.

Bibliographies of presidents of the United States
Books about politics of the United States
Political bibliographies
Bibliographies of people